Andrey Ivanovich Khimich (born 14 December 1937 in Makiivka, Varva Raion, Chernihiv Oblast) is a Soviet-born Ukraianian sprint canoer who competed in the early 1960s. At the 1964 Summer Olympics in Tokyo, he won the gold in the C-2 1000 m event. Khimich also won a silver medal in the C-2 10000 m event at the 1966 ICF Canoe Sprint World Championships in East Berlin.

He is finished the Cherkasy State Teacher-Training Institute (now Cherkasy National University) in 1959.

External links
 

1937 births
Canoeists at the 1964 Summer Olympics
Living people
Olympic canoeists of the Soviet Union
Olympic gold medalists for the Soviet Union
Soviet male canoeists
Ukrainian male canoeists
Olympic medalists in canoeing
Medalists at the 1964 Summer Olympics
ICF Canoe Sprint World Championships medalists in Canadian
Sportspeople from Chernihiv Oblast